Andrew "Taylor" Lipsett (born January 2, 1987) is an ice sledge hockey player and Paralympic Gold and bronze medalist. He graduated from Southern Methodist University and is married. He is also a member of the charity "Team for Tomorrow" and has Osteogenesis imperfecta.

References

External links 
 
 
 

1987 births
Living people
American sledge hockey players
Paralympic sledge hockey players of the United States
Paralympic gold medalists for the United States
Paralympic bronze medalists for the United States
Ice sledge hockey players at the 2006 Winter Paralympics
Ice sledge hockey players at the 2010 Winter Paralympics
Ice sledge hockey players at the 2014 Winter Paralympics
Medalists at the 2006 Winter Paralympics
Medalists at the 2010 Winter Paralympics
Medalists at the 2014 Winter Paralympics
People with osteogenesis imperfecta
People from Mesquite, Texas
Sportspeople from the Dallas–Fort Worth metroplex
Southern Methodist University alumni
Paralympic medalists in sledge hockey